The Government of Durrës was the 4th ruling government of Albania formed after the events at the Congress of Durrës from which it takes its name. The government was headed by Turhan Pashë Përmeti, for whom it was the second time in the position of prime minister.

The government was dismissed from office by the Congress of Lushnjë as pro-Italian and that had betrayed the interests of the Albanian people and state.

Cabinet

See also
 Politics of Albania
 Turhan Pashë Përmeti

References

G4
Ministries established in 1914
1914 establishments in Albania
1914 disestablishments in Albania
Ministries disestablished in 1914